Duham Hall may refer to:

 Durham Hall, Surry Hills, an historic house in Sydney, New South Wales
 Durham Hall, an academic building on the Campus of Virginia Tech
 Durham Hall, a home built by Moses Austin in Potosi, Missouri

Architectural disambiguation pages